Arnold Laasner (27 June 1906 – 29 January 1964) was an Estonian footballer.

He was born in Tallinn.

He began his football career at the age of 14 in Nõmme. In 1925 he joined with the club SK Tallinna Sport. He became the Estonian champion in 1925, 1929 and 1931–33. He won the silver medal in 1926, 1927, 1930, 1934, 1936 and 1943, and won the bronze medal in 1939. In 1932, he scored the most goals (fourteen) in Meistriliiga and scored 54 goals in the championship during his career.

He also played ice hockey, volleyball and especially basketball, winning a silver medal for the Estonian championships in 1927. He played also one match for Estonia men's national basketball team.

At the end of World War II, he fled to Germany. Later, he moved to United Kingdom. He died in Gloucester in 1964.

References

1906 births
1964 deaths
Estonian footballers
Estonian men's basketball players
Estonian World War II refugees
Estonian emigrants to the United Kingdom
Footballers from Tallinn